Kuroda (written:  lit. "black ricefield") is a Japanese surname. Notable people with the surname include:

, Japanese painter
Akinobu Kuroda 黒田 明伸, Japanese historian
Chris Kuroda, lighting designer and operator for the band Phish and Justin Bieber, among others
Emily Kuroda (born 1952), American actress
, Japanese actress
, governor of Bank of Japan and former president of Asian Development Bank
, Japanese-born English actress
, Japanese baseball player
, pen name of a Japanese manga artist
, Japanese painter
, Japanese far-left philosopher and social theorist
, famed strategist under Toyotomi Hideyoshi
, Samurai, son of Kuroda Kanbei
, Japanese politician and second Prime Minister of Japan
, Japanese haiku poet
, Japanese ornithologist
, Japanese writer
Paul Kuroda, (1917-2001), Japanese-American nuclear scientist
Robert T. Kuroda (1922–1944), American soldier Medal of Honor recipient
, linguist, inventor of the Kuroda normal form
, child of Emperor Akihito and Empress Michiko of Japan
, Japanese general
, Japanese voice actor
, Japanese woodworker and lacquerware artist
, Japanese professional wrestler
, Japanese malacologist
, Japanese anime screenwriter

Fictional characters
, a character in the visual novel School Days

Japanese-language surnames